Ivanivka, is a village in northeastern Ukraine, located in Okhtyrka Raion of Sumy Oblast.

History 

According to a census of the Russian Empire in 1864, the village had a population of 440, including 225 men and 235 women.

Like many other villages throughout Ukraine, the population suffered through the Holodomor in 1932-1933, with many dying from starvation.

This is the birthplace of famous painter Alexander Bogomazov.

References 

 Історія міст та сіл України. Том Сумская область. стор. 212–221 (рос.)
 Інформація на сайті району (Archived)
 Погода в селі Іванівка (Archived)

Villages in Okhtyrka Raion